Pablo Ignacio Becker (born 29 April 1993) is a retired Argentine professional footballer who played as a forward.

Career
Rosario Central moved Becker into their first-team squad in 2010. After being an unused substitute for Primera B Nacional fixtures versus Tiro Federal and Unión Santa Fe, Becker made his senior bow on 4 December 2010 during a home defeat to Gimnasia y Esgrima. In 2012, San Telmo of Primera B Metropolitana loaned Becker. Six appearances followed during 2011–12. He returned to Rosario Central in July 2012, subsequently scoring on his first start back on 8 September against Nueva Chicago. He scored two goals in seventeen games in 2012–13 as the club won promotion to the Primera División.

He made thirty-nine appearances and scored one goal in his first four seasons in the top-flight. On 30 August 2016, Becker joined fellow Primera División side Defensa y Justicia on loan. He featured just three times for Defensa y Justicia. Chile's Deportes Antofagasta completed the loan signing of Becker in June 2018.

On 9 January 2022, Becker signed with  Defensores Belgrano. However, 12 days later, 27-year old Becker decided to end his career due to "personal reasons".

Personal life
His brother, Diego Becker, is also a professional footballer.

Career statistics
.

Honours
Rosario Central
Primera B Nacional: 2012–13

References

External links

1993 births
Living people
People from Caseros Department
Argentine people of German descent
Argentine footballers
Association football forwards
Argentine expatriate footballers
Expatriate footballers in Chile
Argentine expatriate sportspeople in Chile
Primera Nacional players
Primera B Metropolitana players
Argentine Primera División players
Chilean Primera División players
Rosario Central footballers
San Telmo footballers
Defensa y Justicia footballers
C.D. Antofagasta footballers
Aldosivi footballers
Defensores de Belgrano footballers
Sportspeople from Santa Fe Province